Paniceae is a large tribe of the subfamily Panicoideae in the grasses (Poaceae), the only in the monotypic supertribe Panicodae. It includes roughly 1,500 species in 84 genera, primarily found in tropical and subtropical regions of the world. Paniceae includes species using either of the C4 and C3 photosynthetic pathways, as well as presumably intermediate species. Most of the millets are members of tribe Paniceae.

The tribe is subdivided into seven subtribes, but some genera are as yet unplaced (incertae sedis). Species in the Paniceae have an ancestral chromosome number (monoploid number) of x = 9, while species with x = 10 formerly included are now recognised as separate tribe, Paspaleae.

Subtribes and genera
Subdivisions:

Gallery

References

Sources

 Barkworth, M. (2003). "Paniceae" in Flora North America. Vol. 25. pp. 353–602.
 Brown, R. (1814). A Voyage to Terra Australis. Vol. 2. p. 582.

External links

Panicoideae
Poaceae tribes